Mateusz Prus (born March 9, 1990, in Zamość) is a Polish former professional footballer who played as a goalkeeper.

Club career
Prus joined Roda in the summer of 2010. He made his Eredivisie debut in February 2011.

References

External links
 Voetbal International profile 
 

1990 births
Living people
Polish footballers
People from Zamość
Association football goalkeepers
Hetman Zamość players
Zagłębie Sosnowiec players
Roda JC Kerkrade players
Ruch Chorzów players
Chrobry Głogów players
Raków Częstochowa players
Świt Nowy Dwór Mazowiecki players
Eredivisie players
I liga players
II liga players
III liga players
Polish expatriate footballers
Expatriate footballers in the Netherlands
Polish expatriate sportspeople in the Netherlands
Sportspeople from Lublin Voivodeship